Barbara Majeski (born April 22, 1973) is an American TV personality and lifestyle expert based in Princeton, New Jersey.

Life and career 
Majeski was born with a twin brother on April 22, 1973 to parents Eleanor and Harri in Livingston, New Jersey. Raised in West Windsor, New Jersey, she attended West Windsor-Plainsboro High School South and graduated from Towson State University in 1996 with a Bachelor's degree.

In 2015, Majeski was diagnosed with stage three colon cancer and soon after she got divorced. After surgery and 12 rounds of chemo treatments, her cancer went into remission. In 2016, she was booked for a segment on The Today Show. Her lifestyle segment became popular and she got a regular segment on The Today Show.

Majeski appears in life style segments, mom panels, DIY segments on television, in particular on morning shows. She's also appeared on NY Live, Chicago the Jam, Inside Edition and Good Day New York, among others. She is mainly known for “Curator of the Good Life”.

Majeski also hosts her own podcast called Baring It All.

References 

1973 births
Living people
American television personalities
People from Livingston, New Jersey
People from Princeton, New Jersey
People from West Windsor, New Jersey
Towson University alumni
West Windsor-Plainsboro High School South alumni